Dylan may refer to:

Arts and entertainment
 Bob Dylan (born 1941), American singer and songwriter
 Dylan (1973 album), a 1973 album by Bob Dylan
 Dylan (2007 album), a 2007 compilation album by Bob Dylan
 Dylan (musician), professional name of English singer-songwriter Natasha Woods
 Dylan (play), a 1964 play by Sidney Michael about Dylan Thomas

Technology and engineering
 Dylan (programming language), a language with Lisp-like semantics and ALGOL-like syntax
 Dylan, a RAID storage system by Quantel
 Honda Dylan, a high-end 125cc Honda scooter in Vietnam

Other uses
 Dylan (name), a given name of Welsh origin and a family name (including a list of persons with the name)
 Dylan Thomas (1914–1953), Welsh poet
 Dylan ail Don, a sea-god in Welsh mythology

See also
 Dilan (disambiguation)
 Dillon (disambiguation)
 Dilyn, a dog
 Dilyn (drug), an expectorant